Adriano Pezzoli (born 21 May 1964) is a former Italian male long-distance runner who competed at two editions of the IAAF World Cross Country Championships at senior level (1990, 1991).

References

External links
 Adriano Pezzoli profile at Association of Road Racing Statisticians

1964 births
Living people
Italian male long-distance runners
Italian male marathon runners
Italian male cross country runners